Devin Bowen (born May 18, 1972) is an American former ATP World Tour professional tennis player. A doubles specialist, he reached a career high doubles ranking of World No. 39, in 2003.

Performance timelines

Doubles

Mixed doubles

ATP career finals

Doubles: 5 (1 title, 4 runner-ups)

ATP Challenger and ITF Futures finals

Doubles: 15 (5–10)

References

External links
 
 

1972 births
American male tennis players
Sportspeople from Huntington Beach, California
Sportspeople from Newport Beach, California
Tennis people from California
Living people